H.E.R.O. (standing for Helicopter Emergency Rescue Operation) is a video game written by John Van Ryzin and published by Activision for the Atari 2600 in March 1984. It was ported to the Apple II, Atari 5200,  Atari 8-bit family, ColecoVision, Commodore 64, MSX, and ZX Spectrum. 
The player uses a helicopter backpack and other tools to rescue victims trapped deep in a mine. The mine is made up of multiple screens using a flip screen style.

Sega released a version of the game for its SG-1000 console in Japan in 1985. While the gameplay was identical, Sega changed the backpack from a helicopter to a jetpack.

Gameplay

The player assumes control of Roderick Hero (sometimes styled as "R. Hero"), a one-man rescue team. Miners working in Mount Leone are trapped, and it's up to Roderick to reach them.

The player is equipped with a backpack-mounted helicopter unit, which allows him to hover and fly, along with a helmet-mounted laser and a limited supply of dynamite. Each level consists of a maze of mine shafts that Roderick must safely navigate in order to reach the miner trapped at the bottom. The backpack has a limited amount of power, so the player must reach the miner before the power supply is exhausted, in which the player restarts the level from the beginning if that happens.  The player only needs enough power to reach the trapped miner - not to return with him as well.

Mine shafts may be blocked by cave-ins or magma, which require dynamite to clear. The helmet laser can also destroy cave-ins, but far more slowly than dynamite. Unlike a cave-in, magma is lethal when touched. Later levels include walls of magma with openings that alternate between open and closed requiring skillful navigation. The mine shafts are populated by spiders, bats and other unknown creatures that are deadly to the touch; these creatures can be destroyed using the laser or dynamite.

Some deep mines are flooded, forcing players to hover safely above the water. In later levels, monsters strike out from below the water. Some mine sections are illuminated by lanterns. If the lantern is somehow destroyed, the layout of that section becomes invisible. Exploding dynamite lights up the mine for a brief time.

Points are scored for each cave-in cleared and each creature destroyed. When the player reaches the miner, points are awarded for the rescue, along with the amount of power remaining in the backpack and for each remaining stick of dynamite. Extra lives are awarded for every 20,000 points scored.

Reception 

In a review of the ColecoVision port, Electronic Games wrote, "Activision has wisely used the superior graphics of the CV units to provide a breathtaking underground panorama," and concluded, "Congrats Activision! H.E.R.O. is a real champion."

In the June 1987 issue of Zzap!64, Julian  Rignall wrote—of the C64 version—"HERO looks awful, sounds terrible but plays absolutely beautifully."

Computer and Video Games rated the Atari VCS version 93% and the ColecoVision version 94% in 1989.

Legacy

H.E.R.O. is included in the retrogaming compilation Activision Anthology.

In 1985, ANALOG Computing published a clone called R.O.T.O. for the Atari 8-bit family.

References

External links
 H.E.R.O. for the Atari 2600 at Atari Mania
 H.E.R.O for the Atari 8-bit family at Atari Mania
 
 
 

1984 video games
Activision games
Apple II games
Atari 2600 games
Atari 5200 games
Atari 8-bit family games
ColecoVision games
Commodore 64 games
Helicopter video games
MSX games
SG-1000 games
ZX Spectrum games
Video games developed in the United States